The fourth season of the Pakistani music television series Coke Studio commenced airing on 22 May 2011 and ended on 17 July 2011.

Rohail Hyatt and his wife Umber Hyatt remained as the producers of the show. The houseband recruited drummer Raheel Manzar Paul and vocalist Rachel Viccaji. The houseband saw Sanam Saeed and Saba Shabbir leaving the band and the rest of the houseband remained unchanged.

Artists 
Sanam Marvi made a return to the fourth season of the show performing for the second time at Coke Studio, she first appeared in the previous season. Other featuring artists in the fourth season included, progressive metal band Mizraab, Balouchi folk singer Akhtar Chanal Zahri, pop rock band Jal from Lahore, qawwal group of Fareed Ayaz & Abu Muhammad and eastern classical Punjabi singer Attaullah Khan Esakhelvi.

Featured Artists 

 Akhtar Chanal Zahri
 Asif Hussain Samraat
 Attaullah Khan Esakhelvi
 Bilal Khan
 Fareed Ayaz & Abu Mohammad
 Jal
 Kaavish
 Komal Rizvi
 Mizraab
 Mole
 Qurat-ul-Ain Balouch
 Sajjad Ali
 Sanam Marvi
 Akhtar Chanal Zahri
 The Sketches
 Ustaad Naseer-ud-din Saami

Backing Vocals 

 Rachel Viccaji
 Zoe Viccaji

House Band 

 Asad Ahmed
 Babar Ali Khanna
 Jaffer Ali Zaidi
 Javed Iqbal
 Kamran "Mannu" Zafar
 Louis 'Gumby' Pinto
 Omran "Momo" Shafique
 Raheel Manzar Paul
 Sikander Mufti
 Zulfiq 'Shazee' Ahmed Khan

Production 
Speaking at the launch of Coke Studio Season 12, Rohail Hyatt said:

Songs 
The webcast of fourth season began on 19 May 2011 and concluded on 15 July 2011. The season featured 5 episodes. The show was produced at Rohail Hyatt's production company Frequency Media Pvt. Ltd and distributed by Coca-Cola Pakistan.

References

External links
 

Season04
2011 Pakistani television seasons